is a Shinto shrine located in the city of Gifu, Gifu Prefecture, Japan. From long ago, it has been considered a good place for married couples and children to go for good luck. One legend associated with Kashimori Shrine is that when Tenma, a mythical horse, landed behind the shrine, it left a hoof print in stone that can still be seen today. Each year, on April 5, the shrine hosts the Gifu Festival, along with Inaba Shrine and Kogane Shrine.

Enshrined god
The Ichihaya-no-mikoto god is worshipped here. His parents are the Inishiki-Irihiko-no-mikoto god (Inaba Shrine) and the Nunoshihime-no-mikoto goddess (Kogane Shrine). Because of the relationship between their three gods, these three shrines have a very close relationship. As this shrine is built for the child of the two other gods, it is the smallest of the three shrines.

References

Buildings and structures in Gifu
Shinto shrines in Gifu Prefecture